Elisabeth Böhm née Haggenmüller (18 June 1921, in Mindelheim – 6 September 2012 in Cologne) was a German architect. Frequently working together with her husband, Gottfried Böhm, she participated in the design of numerous projects, especially their interiors.

Biography

Böhm studied architecture at the Technical University Munich where she met Gottfried Böhm whom she married in 1948. Her husband took over the family architecture business in Cologne from his father Dominikus Böhm who died in 1955. Initially, Böhm spent most of her time at home raising their four children, only spending short periods at the office. She later returned to more intensive work, developing plans for housing projects and housing estates. Of particular note are her interior designs for the castle of Godesburg, near Bonn (1959), the town hall of Bensberg in Bergisch Gladbach (1969) and for the modern additions to Kauzenburg Castle near Bad Kreuznach in the early 1970s. She was also behind the circular foyer designed in connection with the expansion of the Stuttgart Theatre in 1984.

Böhm lived and worked in Cologne until her death. Her relationship with her husband and her sons and their reactions to her death is explored in a 2014 documentary titled "Concrete Love — The Böhm Family."

References
The article draws on the German Wikipedia article.

Literature 
 Kristin Feireiss: Elisabeth Böhm: Stadtstrukturen und Bauten Articles by Kristin Feireiss, Hiltrud Krier, Manfred Sack. Tübingen: Wasmuth, 2006. 

1921 births
2012 deaths
20th-century German architects
German women architects
Technical University of Munich alumni
20th-century German women